J.T. Barber School is a historic high school building for African-American students located at New Bern, Craven County, North Carolina.  It was built in stages between 1951 and 1955, and is a one-story, flat roofed, concrete block school with brick veneer in the Modern style.  The school consists of seven separate wings consisting of a cafeteria, a library, a gymnasium flanked on either side by classrooms, an auditorium and music room, and three additional classroom wings.  Also on the property are contributing athletic fields.  The school has also operated as a middle school and elementary school.

It was listed on the National Register of Historic Places in 2006.

References

African-American history of North Carolina
High schools in North Carolina
School buildings on the National Register of Historic Places in North Carolina
Modern Movement architecture in the United States
School buildings completed in 1955
Buildings and structures in New Bern, North Carolina
National Register of Historic Places in Craven County, North Carolina
1951 establishments in North Carolina